The 1990–91 Creighton Bluejays men's basketball team represented Creighton University during the 1990–91 NCAA Division I men's basketball season. The Bluejays, led by head coach Tony Barone, played their home games at the Omaha Civic Auditorium. The Jays finished with a 24–8 record (12–4 MVC), and won the Missouri Valley Conference tournament to earn an automatic bid to the 1991 NCAA tournament. As No. 11 seed in the West region, the Jays knocked off No. 6 seed New Mexico State in the opening round, then fell to Seton Hall in the second round.

Roster

Schedule and results
 
|-
!colspan=9 style=| Regular season

|-
!colspan=9 style=| Missouri Valley Conference tournament

|-
!colspan=9 style=| 1991 NCAA tournament

Awards and honors
Chad Gallagher – MVC Player of the Year

NBA draft

References

Creighton
Creighton
Creighton Bluejays men's basketball seasons
Creighton Bluejays men's bask
Creighton Bluejays men's bask